Harinder Jeet Singh Takhar (born ) is a former politician in Ontario, Canada. He was a Liberal member of the Legislative Assembly of Ontario from 2003 to 2018 who represented the ridings of Mississauga Centre and Mississauga—Erindale. He served in the cabinets of Dalton McGuinty and Kathleen Wynne.

Background
Takhar was born to a Sikh family in the Indian state of Punjab, with a background in farming and civil service work.  He moved to Canada in 1974, and arrived in Mississauga, Ontario in 1977. He obtained a bachelor's degree in English and a master's degree in economics and political science and recently added Kellogg Schlich's EMBA degree to his FCPA and FCMA designations. 

He has been certified as a CMA. He has taught CMA and CGA-accredited courses at Sheridan College for thirteen years. Takhar held senior financial positions with AGRA Industries Limited, Linear Technology Inc./Gennum Corporation, and Timex Canada Inc. He also served as an Associate Director and Chief Financial Officer of Peel Dtsricy School Board from 1994 to 2003. In addition, he also served as the president and chief executive officer of the Chalmers Group of Companies until his election to the Ontario legislature.

Takhar received the 2001 Community Service Award from the Society of Management Accountants of Ontario for "demonstrating selflessness and kindness for the benefit of society." He lives with his wife Balwinder and their two daughters in Mississauga.

Politics
Takhar ran in the 2003 provincial election as the Liberal candidate in the riding of Mississauga Centre. He defeated Progressive Conservative incumbent Rob Sampson by 2,620 votes. He ran again in 2007 in the redistributed riding of Mississauga—Erindale defeating PC candidate David Brow by 6,638 votes. He was re-elected in 2011. While it was initially reported that he intended to retire, he changed his mind about running and was re-elected in June 2014.

He was appointed Minister of Transportation on October 23, 2003, by Premier Dalton McGuinty. He is the first Indian-Canadian to hold a cabinet post in Ontario. In October 2007 he was appointed as a Minister of Small Business and Entrepreneurship. 

In September 2008, Takhar was reappointed to a slightly revised cabinet post of Minister of Small Business and Consumer Services. In June 2009, Takhar's moved to the positions of Minister of Government Services.

He resigned from Cabinet in 2012 to stand as a candidate in the 2013 Liberal leadership convention to choose McGuinty's successor. Takhar ran a very focused campaign, put forward very innovative policies, and surprised everyone with the number of delegates he could secure to support his leadership bid. After the first round, he withdrew to endorse Sandra Pupatello, who went on to lose to Kathleen Wynne.

On February 11, 2013, Wynne reappointed Takhar to Minister of Government Services. Also, it made him the Management Board Chair. On May 8, 2013, he resigned from Cabinet after being hospitalized after he lost his mother .

He remained in the legislature as MPP until he decided not to seek reelection in June 2018. He currently serves as the Chairman/CEO of Chalmers Group of Companies based in Mississauga. He previously served as the Chairman of United Way of Peel and Chair of the Board of Credit Valley Hospital. He was also the founding member and president of the International Punjabi of Commerce. Takhar frequently appears on radio programs to express his views regarding political and economic issues and well a respected member of the South Asian community.

Cabinet positions

Electoral record

References

Notes

Citations

External links

1951 births
21st-century Canadian politicians
Canadian accountants
Canadian politicians of Indian descent
Canadian Sikhs
Indian emigrants to Canada
Living people
Members of the Executive Council of Ontario
Ontario Liberal Party MPPs
Politicians from Mississauga